Pseudodaphnella intaminata is a species of sea snail, a marine gastropod mollusk in the family Raphitomidae.

Description
The length of the shell attains 7 mm, its diameter 3 mm.

All types were destroyed in the Great Chicago Fire.

Distribution
This species occurs in the China Seas.

References

 Gould, A. A. Descriptions of shells collected in the North Pacific Exploring Expedition1860. under Captains Ringgold and Rodgers. Proc. Boston Soc. Nat. Hist. 1859-1860 vol.7 p. 339
 Gould, A. 1860. Descriptions of New Shells Collected by the United States North Pacific Exploring Expedition. Proc. Boston Soc. Nat. Hist. 7: 323-340.

External links
  R.I. Johnson, The Recent Mollusca of Augustus Addison Gould; United States National Museum, bulletin 239, Washington D.C. 1964
 
 Gastropods.com: Pseudodaphnella intaminata

intaminata
Gastropods described in 1860